Plymouth was a parliamentary borough in Devon, which elected two members of parliament (MPs) to the House of Commons in 1298 and again from 1442 until 1918, when the borough was merged with the neighbouring Devonport and the combined area divided into three single-member constituencies.

History

In the Unreformed Parliament (to 1832)
Plymouth first sent MPs to the Parliament of 1298, but after that the right lapsed until being restored in 1442, after which it returned two members to each parliament. The borough originally consisted of the parish of Plymouth in Devon; in 1641, the parish was divided into two, St Charles and St Andrew, and both remained in the borough. (This included most of the town as it existed in mediaeval and early modern times, but only a fraction of the city as it exists today). Plymouth was a major port, both naval and commercial, and unlike many of the boroughs of the unreformed parliament fully merited its status both for its importance and its population. (It was one of the few boroughs that retained both its members in the short-lived reform of the electoral system during the Commonwealth.) By the time of the Great Reform Act of 1832, the population of the borough was a little over 31,000, but the whole conurbation including the two nearby towns of Devonport and Stonehouse, had about 75,000 inhabitants.

Until 1660, the right to vote in Plymouth was restricted to the corporation. In that year, the House of Commons determined that the right was vested in the "Mayor and Commonalty", but the term "commonalty" was ambiguous and in 1740 it was held to mean only the freemen of the town rather than all the freeholders, a much more restrictive franchise. This amounted to only about 200 voters in the 18th and early 19th century, and the highest number actually recorded as voting was 177. Since the corporation was responsible for electing its own successors and also controlled the admission of freemen, it was easy for any interest having once gained control of the borough to retain it. Because of the importance of the naval dockyard to the town's prosperity, Plymouth fell under the influence of the government very early, and from at least the late 17th century was regarded as a safe constituency where ministers could nominate both members with little likelihood of serious opposition.

The members so nominated almost invariably included a distinguished naval officer, or instead on occasions a high official of the Admiralty (who, of course, could bring valuable patronage to Plymouth). When the Admiralty nominated only one member, the other was often the choice of the governor of the garrison, though at the turn of the 19th century the Prince Regent (who was recorder of the borough) was generally allowed to pick both members.

Nevertheless, government control of the borough did not entirely preclude an influential role for local aristocratic or landed families, not least because somebody had to manage the government's patronage and decide how it should be exercised. Around 1700, the Trelawny family considered themselves "patrons" of Plymouth (which, together with their pocket boroughs of East Looe and West Looe in Cornwall, gave them control of six seats in Parliament). Charles Trelawny, who was Governor of Plymouth from 1696 to 1712, had power of nomination to both seats throughout this period, sitting himself as MP and choosing his brother for the other seat on one occasion.

Many of Plymouth's MPs, naval or otherwise, justified the borough's confidence in them by bringing patronage to the town. Namier and Brooke quote a letter from the First Lord of the Admiralty, Lord Sandwich, to the Plymouth MP Viscount Barrington, rebuking him for the extent of the continual requests he was making on their behalf; but many of these requests, it is clear, were nevertheless being met.

After the Reform Act (1832–1918)
The Great Reform Act left the borough of Plymouth unaltered, but its nature was affected radically. One change was the franchise reform, giving more than 1,400 of the inhabitants the vote. (Many of these, however, would have been able to vote for the county constituency of Devon before the Reform Act, since 40 shilling freeholders could vote for the county even if their property was within the borough boundaries.)

The second change was the creation of a new borough for the neighbouring town of Devonport, which included both Devonport and Stonehouse. These two towns, though outside the boundaries of Plymouth borough, had been influential on its politics, but now had two MPs of their own. As a result, the naval influence on Plymouth was somewhat reduced after 1832, though the importance of the dockyards to the economic interests of the constituency remained. In 1901, 7.9% of Plymouth's population were in defence-related occupations and a further 1.6% in boat or ship manufacture; but in Devonport the figures were 29.9% and 1.6% respectively.

Once governments could no longer easily abuse their powers of patronage to secure their seats in such constituencies, the naval connection could be a hindrance rather than a help: Sir Edward Clarke, Conservative MP for Plymouth in the latter years of the 19th century, had considerable difficulty securing re-election in 1892 because of local criticism of the Conservative government's Admiralty policy on payment for shipwrights. Nevertheless, the naval aspect was probably normally helpful to the Conservative vote at this period: by the early 20th century, Plymouth was one of England's most densely populated cities, and also had a high non-conformist population, which would normally have suggested a safe Liberal seat, but in fact the two parties polled fairly equally and Conservatives were elected more often than not.

Abolition
In 1914, the areas covered by the separate Plymouth and Devonport constituencies had been combined into a single county borough of Plymouth for local government purposes, and under the parliamentary boundary changes which came into effect at the general election of 1918 both two-member boroughs were abolished and the area of the county borough divided into single-member constituencies. The city's population was now adjudged to entitle it only to three MPs in place of the four it had had previously, and the new constituencies were called Plymouth, Devonport, Plymouth, Drake and Plymouth, Sutton. Of these, the Devonport division was very similar to the old Devonport borough, while the former Plymouth borough was split between the Drake and Sutton divisions.

Members of Parliament

MPs 1442–1640

MPs 1640–1918

Elections

Elections in the 1830s

Elections in the 1840s

 

 
 

 

Fortescue was appointed a Lord Commissioner of the Treasury, requiring a by-election.

Elections in the 1850s

 
  

 
 

 

Mare's election was declared void on petition due to bribery and corruption, causing a by-election.

Elections in the 1860s
Edgcumbe succeeded to the peerage, becoming 4th Earl of Mount Edgcumbe and causing a by-election.

 
 
 

 

Collier was appointed Solicitor General for England and Wales, requiring a by-election.

 

  

 

 

 

 

 

Collier was appointed Attorney General for England and Wales, requiring a by-election.

Elections in the 1870s
Collier was appointed Recorder of Bristol, causing a by-election.

Collier resigned after being appointed a Judge of the Court of Common Pleas, causing a by-election.

Elections in the 1880s 

 

 

Bates was removed upon petition, causing a by-election.

Clarke was appointed Solicitor General for England and Wales, requiring a by-election.

Elections in the 1890s 

Harrison's death caused a by-election.

Elections in the 1900s

Elections in the 1910s

General Election 1914/15:

Another General Election was required to take place before the end of 1915. The political parties had been making preparations for an election to take place and by the July 1914, the following candidates had been selected; 
Unionist: Waldorf Astor, Arthur Benn
Liberal: Thomas Dobson, JH McCawley Ryan

Notes and references
Robert Beatson, A Chronological Register of Both Houses of Parliament (London: Longman, Hurst, Res & Orme, 1807) 
D. Brunton & D. H. Pennington, Members of the Long Parliament (London: George Allen & Unwin, 1954)
Cobbett's Parliamentary history of England, from the Norman Conquest in 1066 to the year 1803 (London: Thomas Hansard, 1808) 
 The Constitutional Year Book for 1913 (London: National Union of Conservative and Unionist Associations, 1913)
F W S Craig, British Parliamentary Election Results 1832–1885 (2nd edition, Aldershot: Parliamentary Research Services, 1989)
 Michael Kinnear, The British Voter (London: BH Batsford, Ltd, 1968)
 Lewis Namier & John Brooke, The History of Parliament: The House of Commons 1754–1790 (London: HMSO, 1964)
 J. E. Neale, The Elizabethan House of Commons (London: Jonathan Cape, 1949)
 T. H. B. Oldfield, The Representative History of Great Britain and Ireland (London: Baldwin, Cradock & Joy, 1816)
 Henry Pelling, Social Geography of British Elections 1885–1910 (London: Macmillan, 1967)
 J Holladay Philbin, Parliamentary Representation 1832 – England and Wales (New Haven: Yale University Press, 1965)
 Edward Porritt and Annie G Porritt, The Unreformed House of Commons (Cambridge University Press, 1903)
 Robert Walcott, English Politics in the Early Eighteenth Century (Oxford: Oxford University Press, 1956)
 Frederic A Youngs, jr, Guide to the Local Administrative Units of England, Vol I (London: Royal Historical Society, 1979)
 

Parliamentary constituencies in Devon (historic)
Constituencies of the Parliament of the United Kingdom established in 1298
Constituencies of the Parliament of the United Kingdom disestablished in 1918
Politics of Plymouth, Devon